A donatary captain was a Portuguese colonial official to whom the Crown granted jurisdiction, rights, and revenues over some colonial territory.

Captaincy system
Due to the impossibility of exercising direct control and sovereignty over overseas territories, the captain-major was the channel by which the monarch could delegate his powers, with certain restrictions, under the responsibility of peoples he felt he could confide. The  could administer, in the sovereign's name, the lands for which he was assigned, with all the regalia, rights, and obligations, with the exception of certain limits, including military authority over soldiers and detachments of the crown, or the administration of justice.

The Captains were agents named by the Donatário, and after 1495, by the Crown, to a lifetime title that was passed down by the "legitimate male heirs". As administrators, the Captains enjoyed various judicial and economic privileges that provided an incentive to settle and develop their captaincies. They had the authority to administer sentences, with the exception of those involving penalties of death or mutilation. Economically, they had the exclusive authority to mill, bake bread and sell salt, in addition to their entitlement to receive rent paid to the King for lands, fees and taxes due. In addition, they could receive a tithe (the tenth portion) paid to the captaincy directly. In addition to the regalia of office, the captains-major would hold title to the best parcels of lands and be able to contract renters to the donatárias (lands of the Donatários), in the name of the crown. Many of the donatários were hereditary, with a few exceptions, referred in the Salic Laws of the time; these laws regulated all aspects of life, including crime, taxation, indemnity, and female inheritance. The Captains were less restricted to these conditions.

Yet, many of these captains were selected as part of a consolidation of relationships between the Donatários and their vassals. This subjective process usually involved close associations with the royal family or confidants of the Crown: a feudal meritocracy of vassals. This could result from rendering service during the overseas expansion or resulting from some heroism that may have been rewarded with a title. The monarch surrounded himself with "trustworthy" men who were existed within a web of relationships, forming a restricted circle of individuals. In some cases precedents were superseded in favor of people they could trust, including setting aside the laws of male inheritance in favor of a daughter, for example (as with the case of the daughter of Jácome de Bruges). Yet, most had to prove themselves, as was the case with Álvaro de Ornelas (captain of Pico), who lost his captaincy due to "inefficiency" in its settlement.

This weakened the 's control over the officials, resulting in a disparity between actual and perceived function. Some were either incompetent in their roles, power-hungry or just absent. In some cases the inhabitants of certain possessions were often subject to irregularities resulting from judicial or fiscal issues. Some captains appointed overseers,  (auditors) to represent them who were unqualified to respond to the issues of their masters.

Captaincies
The following is an incomplete list of some of the captaincies and their first Donatary-Captains:

Madeira

There were three captaincies in the archipelago of Madeira, associated with the three principal discoverers of the islands:
 Funchal, was bestowed to  João Gonçalves Zarco
 Machico, was bestowed to  Tristão Vaz Teixeira
 Porto Santo, was appointed to  Bartolomeu Perestrello

Azores

Following their discovery, Gonçalo Velho Cabral became the first Donatary-Captain of the islands, beginning with the island of Santa Maria, but later including the island of São Miguel when it was discovered. The progressive discovery of the islands of the archipelago resulted in new captaincies; in total, there have been thirteen unique captaincies in Azores since their discovery:
 Santa Maria, part of the captaincy of Gonçalo Velho Cabral, Santa Maria and São Miguel, was later divided by his nephew João Soares de Albergaria, and Santa Maria left in the hands of his descendants;
 São Miguel, part of the captaincy of Gonçalo Velho Cabral was sold by João Soares de Albergaria to its third  Rui Gonçalves da Câmara;
 Angra, originally a single administration under the captaincy of Jácome de Bruges, the southern portion of Terceira was carved out and allocated to João Vaz Corte-Real;
 Praia, quarrelling between João Vaz Corte-Real and Álvaro Martins Homem after the mysterious "disappearance" of Jácome de Bruge, resulted in the latter receiving Praia;
 Praia da Graciosa, initially allocated to Duarte Barreto do Couto at the time of its early settlement, his mysterious disappearance left it in the caretaker-ship of his wife, until her brother Vasco Gil Sodré came to assist her in guaranteeing it within her family;
 Santa Cruz, Pedro Correio da Cunha (brother-in-law of Christopher Columbus), who arrived on the island from Porto Santo, obtained the captaincy in 1474, after the mysterious disappearance of Duarte Barreto do Couto;
 Graciosa, Vasco Gil Sodré attempted to obtain the captaincy of Graciosa following a Castilian incursion in 1475. but using the same logic, the crown decided to unify the island under one captain: Pedro Correio do Couto.
 São Jorge, originally bestowed to João Vaz Corte-Real, the island was a fiefdom of Terceira, until re-incorporated by the Crown, after Manuel de Moura Corte-Real, donatary captain of Angra, decided to maintain his allegiance to Philip III;
 Faial, the island was placed under the administration of Josse van Huerter, even after he failed on his first attempt to settle the island. This would be a discrepancy, since his second attempt at settling and developing the territory resulted in greater expansion;
 Pico, Álvaro de Ornelas attempted to settle the island from 1460, bringing colonists from northern Portugal, who arrived by way of Terceira and Graciosa, but his attempt was slow and resulted in failure;
 Faial and Pico, the island of Pico was incorporated into the Faialense administration of the Huerter/Dutra family on 29 December 1482, following the inefficient failure of Álvaro de Ornelas to spearhead and expand settlements;
 Flores and Corvo, developed without any clear statue and late in its settlement, the dual island fiefdom functioned within a feudal hierarchy, following its settlement by Diogo de Teive.

Africa
 
 Portuguese Guinea, before it was united in 1879 under that name with its own Governor, and separated from Portuguese Cape Verde, remaining Portuguese till 1974:
Bissau, 1687–1879; see Colonial Heads of Bissau
Cacheu (after Administrators since 1614) c.1640–1879; see also Colonial Heads of Cacheu
 in present Ghana, since the 21 January 1482 foundation of the Portuguese Gold Coast (Fort São Jorge da Mina de Ouro [Elmina: 21 January 1482-28/9 August 1637], Fort de Santo António de Axim [Axim: 1486 – February 1642], Fort São Francisco Xavier [Osu: 1640–42] Fort São Sebastião [Shama: 1526–1637]), it always has its single captain-major, until after the 29 August 1637 Dutch occupation of its capital São Jorge da Mina, it was on 9 January 1642 ceded to the Dutch (becoming part of Dutch Gold Coast)
Mazagan (El Jadida), since it became in 1506 a Portuguese possession, till 1608, afterwards it had its own Governors until on 11 March 1769 it was incorporated into the sultanate of Morocco
Mombasa on the coast of later Kenya (since 1502 a sultanate, Mvita in Swahili or Manbasa in Arabic, independent from Kilwa Kisiwani) since its 1593 Portuguese occupation had captains-major (since 1638 as a Portuguese colony, subordinated to Goa in India), interrupted 12 December 1698 by Omani sovereignty (under Governors styled Wali in Arabic, or Liwali in Swahili), then a last one as Portuguese rule resumed (12 March 1728 – 21 September 1729 Álvaro Caetano de Melo Castro, next it was lost for good – see also Colonial Heads of Mombasa
Portuguese Mozambique, since 1 March 1498 claimed for Portugal by Vasco da Gama, had captains-major since in 1501 Portuguese administration begins, as Captaincy of Sofala (subordinated to Goa, in India), till 1569, next Captains-general, since 1609 Governors, since March 1837 Governors-general – see also Colonial Heads of Mozambique

South America
 
Brazilian provinces (some had Governors from the start):
Ceará, a captaincy since 1619 (1621–1656 subordinated to Maranhão), there were Captains-major 30 June 1699- 17 January 1799, then Ceará captaincy was split from Pernambuco (to which it had been subordinated since 1656) under its own Governor
Espírito Santo, which had been a  under its own Governors since 1535, had captains-major 1627–1675, then again two Governors Donatário, and more Captains-major 1682–1799 (though since 1718 it was a crown colony, subordinated to Bahia), afterwards again Governors
Grão-Pará had Captains-majors since in 1615 the settlement begun as a part of Marahão (it was the residence of its Governors 1737–1755) – 1753, next Governors(-general)
Maranhão had Captains-major 1745 – 1775, next (as before since 9 January 1616) Governors
since its creation in 1582 in the Captaincy of Paraíba, subordinated to Pernambuco, except the occupation (Dutch Directors 1635–1645) and the single 1645–1655 Junta (council), till 1797, next Governors; in 1799 a separate Captaincy of Paraíba do Norte was created
at least one Captain-Major is known of the Captaincy of Pernambuco (1535 founded as donataria of Nova Lusitania, renamed in 1575), Manuel de Mascarenhas Homem; no later than 1699 it got its own Governors, but nevertheless it became in 1716 a Crown colony, called captaincy of Pernambuco.
the 1597 founded Captaincy of Rio Grande had a single Captain-major 1697–1701, Bernardo Vieira de Mello, next Governors, subordinated to Pernambuco till 1808; since 1737 it got its modern name Rio Grande do Norte
at least since 1761 in the 1759 founded Captaincy of São José do Piauí, subordinated to Maranhão until 1811, from then with its own governors, since 28 February 1821 renamed Province of Piauí
São Vicente had Captains-major 1533 (till 1691 alongside Donatários); on 17 April 1709 the name of São Vicente changed to São Paulo e Minas de Ouro, since 18 June 1710 it had its own Governors (in 1750 it was renamed São Paulo, since 28 February 1821 it is a province)
Sergipe d'el Rei had Captains-major since 1696 (also after the 1763 merger with Baía) till 20 February 1821, next it was a province under its own Governors

Asia

since 1518 (except in 1524 1551) a Portuguese Captain-major was appointed to Colombo, the capital of Kotte kingdom on Portuguese Ceylon island (present Sri Lanka), until the last incumbent, Pedro Homem Pereira, was promoted to Governor in 1594; on 27 May 1597, King Dharmapala of Kotte dies without heirs, and bequeaths his entire kingdom to the King of Portugal, making all Ceylon a Portuguese colony
since in 1557 the Portuguese established a trading post at Macau (subordinated to Goa in Portuguese India), it had Captains-major till 1622, then Governors since 7 July 1623 until 19 December 1999 (finally returned to China)
Portuguese Timor, a colony since 1642, had Captains at least since 1647, then Captains-major 1665–1702, next Governors
Ormus (present Hormuz, in Iran) had Captains-major both in September 1507 – January 1508 as the Portuguese first occupy it, again when since 1 April 1515 Hormuz (Ormuz) Island became a Portuguese possession (subordinated to Goa in Portuguese India), until its 3 May 1622 incorporated into Persia
Portuguese Malacca, since 24 August 1511 a Portuguese colony on peninsular Malaysia, had Captains-major since 1512 (subordinated to Goa) till 14 January 1641, next Captains-general, till it was lost on 14 January 1641 to the Dutch.

Captains
Such was the case in the following places:
(see also above for those who later got captains-majors):

Colonial captaincies in Africa
Captains of Santiago (later northern Santiago) 29 January 1462 – 1505
Captains of Ribeira Grande (southern Santiago) 19 September 1462 – after 22 December 1562
Captains of Boa Vista 29 October 1497 – after 1542
Captains of Alcatrazes 1484 – after 1508
Captains of Praia 1526 – after 21 January 1570
Captains of Fogo 1528 – after 12 January 1553
Captains of Santo Antão 13 January 1548 – 15..
in Morocco:
Aguz (Souira Guedima) during the entire 1506 – 1525 Portuguese rule there
Arzila (Asilah), since the 24 August 1471 begin of Portuguese rule till 1545, afterwards it had its own governors (except August 1550 – 1577 temporarily restored to Morocco) until 1589 when it was for good restored to Morocco.
Azamor (Azemmour), since it came on 3 September 1513 under Portuguese rule, till on 30 October 1541 the city was restored to Morocco.
in Safim (Safi), during the entire Portuguese rule there 1488 – Oct 1541

Colonial captaincies in America
 A special case was the Chief of the Captaincy of the Pro-French Republic of Counani 23 July 1886 – 1886 Trajano Benitez; next there were four presidential terms

See also
 Captaincies of the Portuguese Empire
 Captain-General

References
Notes

Sources
 
 

Gubernatorial titles
Subdivisions of the Portuguese Empire
+
Portuguese colonization of the Americas
Colonial Brazil

Portuguese colonisation in Asia